William Arthur may refer to:

 William Arthur (botanist) (fl. 1715), Scottish botanist
William Arthur (clergyman) (1796–1875),  Irish-born American Baptist minister and father of President Chester A. Arthur
 William Arthur (minister) (1819–1901), Wesleyan Methodist minister and author
 William Arthur (mathematician) (1894–1979), British mathematician
 William Brian Arthur (born 1945), a.k.a. W. Brian Arthur, Irish economist
 William Evans Arthur (1825–1897), U.S. politician
 William Arthur (Royal Navy) (1830–1886), British naval officer
 William Hemple Arthur (1856–1936), American general and doctor
 Bill Arthur (1918–1982), Australian politician

See also